The men's 200 metres at the 2007 All-Africa Games were held on July 21–22.

Medalists

Results

Heats
Qualification: First 2 of each heat (Q) and the next 8 fastest (q) qualified for the semifinals.

Wind:Heat 1: -0.8 m/s, Heat 2: +0.5 m/s, Heat 3: -0.6 m/s, Heat 4: +0.8 m/s, Heat 5: +0.7 m/s, Heat 6: +0.7 m/s, Heat 7: +0.5 m/s, Heat 8: +1.8 m/s

Semifinals
Qualification: First 2 of each semifinal (Q) and the next 2 fastest (q) qualified for the final.

Wind:Heat 1: -0.4 m/s, Heat 2: 0.0 m/s, Heat 3: +1.2 m/s

Final
Wind: -0.7 m/s

References
Results

200